= Brewery Creek =

Tributary of the Sacramento River in California

Coordinates: 40.1842°N 122.2388°W

Brewery Creek is a stream in the U.S. state of California. The stream runs 2.25 miles (3.62 km) before it empties into the Sacramento River.

Brewery Creek was so named for the breweries near its course.
